The sixth season of the American comedy television series Scrubs premiered on NBC on November 30, 2006 and concluded on May 17, 2007 and consists of 22 episodes. The series moved to Thursdays at 9:00 pm as a part of NBC's Comedy Night Done Right. Guest stars in the sixth season included Keri Russell and Michael Weston. This season featured the series' musical episode, "My Musical".

Over the course of the season, J.D. and the other characters must mature to fill the different roles required of them. J.D., for instance, is cast in the role of expecting father since his girlfriend, Dr. Kim Briggs (Elizabeth Banks), is pregnant with his child. Turk and Carla become parents when Carla gives birth to their daughter, Isabella Turk. Elliot plans her wedding to Keith, although she and J.D. still harbor feelings for each other. Dr. Cox, as father of two children with Jordan, struggles to prevent his foul disposition from affecting his parenting. Important issues are touched upon, such as the importance of leadership, whether everything happens for a reason, and even death.

Cast and characters

Main cast
Zach Braff as Dr. John "J.D." Dorian
Sarah Chalke as Dr. Elliot Reid
Donald Faison as Dr. Chris Turk
Neil Flynn as The Janitor
Ken Jenkins as Dr. Bob Kelso
John C. McGinley as Dr. Perry Cox
Judy Reyes as Nurse Carla Espinosa

Recurring roles
Sam Lloyd as Ted Buckland
Robert Maschio as Dr. Todd Quinlan
Travis Schuldt as Keith Dudemeister
Aloma Wright as Nurse Laverne Roberts
Christa Miller as Jordan Sullivan
Elizabeth Banks as Dr. Kim Briggs
Johnny Kastl as Dr. Doug Murphy
Mike Schwartz as Lloyd the Delivery Guy

Guest stars

Jay Kenneth Johnson as Dr. Matthews
Michael Weston as Brian Dancer
Keri Russell as Melody O'Harra
Alexander Chaplin as Sam Thompson
Stephanie D'Abruzzo as Patti Miller
Dave Foley as Dr. Lester Hedrick
Nicole Sullivan as Jill Tracy
The Blanks as the Worthless Peons

Production
Season Six saw more writers leave. Tim Hobert left after the first 3 episodes, as did Tad Quill. Gabrielle Allan returned as a consulting producer for the first half season. Clarence Livingston was hired as a story editor. Andy Schwartz and Dave Tennant were hired as staff writers. Even though Eric Weinberg and Sean Russell each wrote an episode this season, they were not part of the writing staff. Weinberg returned to write just that episode. Russell was the script coordinator, who was given the opportunity to write an episode.

Writing staff
Bill Lawrence – executive producer/head writer
Neil Goldman and Garrett Donovan – executive producers/assistant head writers
Bill Callahan – co-executive producer (episodes 1–3) / executive producer/assistant head writer (episodes 4–22)
Tad Quill – executive producer/assistant head writer (episodes 1–3)
Mike Schwartz – co-executive producer
Debra Fordham – supervising producer
Mark Stegemann – supervising producer
Janae Bakken – supervising producer
Angela Nissel – consulting producer
Gabrielle Allan – consulting producer (episodes 1–10)
Tim Hobert – executive producer/assistant head writer (episode 1) / consulting producer (episodes 2–3)
Kevin Biegel – story editor
Aseem Batra – story editor
Clarence Livingston – story editor
Dave Tennant – staff writer
Andy Schwartz – staff writer

Production staff
Bill Lawrence – executive producer/showrunner
Randall Winston – producer
Liz Newman – producer
Danny Rose – co-producer

Directors
Includes directors who directed 2 or more episodes, or directors who are part of the cast and crew
John Putch (4 episodes)
Linda Mendoza (2 episodes)
John Inwood (2 episodes)
Victor Nelli, Jr. (2 episodes)
Bill Lawrence (1 episode)
Zach Braff (1 episode)
Michael McDonald (1 episode)
Rick Blue (editor) (1 episode)
John Michel (editor) (1 episode)
Richard Alexander Wells (assistant director) (1 episode)
Mark Stegemann (writer) (1 episode)
Richard Davis (camera operator) (1 episode)

Episodes

Notes 
† denotes a "supersized" episode, running an extended length of 25–28 minutes.

References 

General references

External links 

 

 
2006 American television seasons
2007 American television seasons
6